Son of Town Hall was a junk raft which made a Transatlantic crossing in 1998, built by Poppa Neutrino.

Writer Alec Wilkinson gave a vivid description of Son of Town Hall in his book The Happiest Man in the World, saying: "The raft looked like a specter, a ghost ship, as if made from rags and rope and lumber, a vessel from the end of the world, or something medieval, a flagship of nothingness, the Armada of the Kingdom of Oblivion."

See also
Poppa Neutrino
Junk raft

References

External links
Our far-flung correspondents: The Crossing, New Yorker, June 27, 2005
Sail of the Century, New York Daily News, Nov. 28, 1998
Adventurer with a Maverick Streak, SF Gate, March 27, 2007
NEIGHBORHOOD REPORT TRIBECA: Lift anchor, Hudson Park Orders Houseboat, New York Times, Oct. 3, 1999
Son of Town Hall, Floating Neutrinos Website

Rafts
Sailing ships of the United States
Ships built in New York City
1995 ships